Redditch is a town and local government district in north-east Worcestershire, England.
The town is divided into separate districts.
All street-name signs in Redditch have the street name in white lettering on a blue background and the district name in black lettering on a white background at the bottom of the sign. In the New Town areas the roads are usually named in alphabetical order and house numbering in the cul-de-sac closes is consecutive, starting with number 1 as the first house on the left as you enter, and the highest house number will be on the opposite side of the road as you leave.

Abbeydale
Abbeydale, along with Batchley and Mayfields, were post-WWII 1950s housing estates built to cope with a population boom and the local councils enforcement of the Conservative government's 'Homes for Heroes' pledge after the 1951 United Kingdom general election.

Astwood Bank

Batchley
Redditch United F.C.'s Valley Stadium is located off the Bromsgrove Road, in Batchley.

Batchley was originally a pre-WWII housing estate  which has continued to expand to meet need for affordable accommodation until the present day. The original estate included many Orlit prefabricated houses though none remain today they were still present into the 1980s. Generally with an equal mixture of privately owned, private rental and social housing it hosts a number of diverse cultural and socio-economic groups. It has three local schools and a park and fishing lake. There are  a number of small privately owned local shops and a Tesco Express with external ATM. It is within a short walking distance of Redditch town centre.

Brockhill
Situated in the north west of the town. Almost entirely a modern residential area and home to many housing estates that to this day are still being constructed since 1996

The district lends its name to Brockhill (HM Prison), a Young Offenders Institution at the Hewell Grange complex.

Callow Hill

Church Green

A commercial district and public space in the centre of Redditch, Church Green forms part of the town centre, however it is treated as a district and typically appears in addresses for buildings located there.  Church Green forms a traditional centre for the town, like a village green or town square, and features a bandstand and fountain (see picture, right).  Dominated by St Stephen's church, it is home to several banks, estate agents, charity shops, a Chinese restaurant and other businesses.
Church Green West historically formed part of the major trunk road, A441 from Birmingham to Evesham.

Church Hill
The largest estate in Redditch, occupying the north-east corner of the town, Church Hill Ward has yearly elections of Councillors due to its size and the number of councillors.

Church Hill is one of the more recent Redditch developments, beginning in 1975. Church Hill has a distinctive layout similar to the Radburn model, with access roads Paper Mill Drive, Ravensbank Drive and Moons Moat Drive largely encircling the estate.  Residences are almost exclusively built around cul-de-sacs. The estate comprises Moon's Moat, Marlfield Barn, and Bomford Hill which boasts a Peace Memorial.  Unlike the many monotenure housing estates in the UK and globally, but in common with many newer estates in Redditch Church Hill is divided into districts correlated with tenure: 

 Church Hill North - primarily private residential
 Church Hill Centre - a small commercial centre with a community centre and flats run by the YMCA, a medical centre, dentist, shops and a take-away, and first and middle schools.
 Church Hill South - primarily social housing
The North and South parts are separated by Church Hill Way (a buses only road), with Church Hill Centre in the middle.  Church Hill's geometric layout, a characteristic of planned new town developments, largely separates private (North) residents from social (South) residents in their day-to-day lives, whilst bringing together the children of both sides of the community at common schools (in particular, at Church Hill Middle School). Church Hill North previously had two first schools, Ravensbank First School (then changed to the present Abbeywood First school) and Marfield Farm First School, however this has since been closed and demolished. It has been characterised by some as something of a social planning experiment..

The estate is named after St Leonards church and the hill it stands on slightly north of Church Hill at Beoley.

Crabbs Cross

Enfield
Named after the Enfield Motorbike factory the area is mainly an industrial estate.  The area was greatly improved during the industrial revolution as a main area in the town for the production of needles and fishing hooks.  It is also the location of Mettis Aerospace which during World War Two was a producer of parts for Spitfire aircraft.  Opposite Mettis on Windsor Road was the old Redditch Gas works which have now been demolished and replaced with a series of apartment blocks and houses.  It is also the home to the local Fire Station which is part of the Hereford and Worcester Fire and Rescue Service, the station has 3 main fire engines. There is also a small retail park which includes a Sainsburys Supermarket & Petrol station and the royal mail delivery office. Also situated is the DVLA test centre for North Worcestershire

Feckenham

Feckenham is in practical terms a separate village, but is governed by Redditch Borough Council and counts administratively as a district.

Feckenham village arose because it straddled the ancient saltway track between Alcester and Droitwich (later a Roman road, now the modern B4090 road), and the early stretches of the Bow Brook.

Feckenham Forest once covered a substantial area of Worcestershire. It was used as a Norman royal hunting forest, and there was a royal hunting lodge near the village.

Greenlands
Greenlands is situated in between Woodrow & Lodge Park. Its mainly known for its 3 large football fields and having a walkway through to Tesco Extra and Oakenshaw which is a popular place for dog walks. It's also home to the South Redditch social club and The Mayfly Public House which has been there since 1958. The rest of Greenlands consist of 1950, 60s and 70s built housing estates. Also situated is; an off license, Chinese take away and a basketball court with mini Skatepark.

Headless Cross

Like Crabbs Cross, Headless Cross was once a village in its own right, it is thought to be named after Headless Cross farm, which was situated roughly where Vaynor Drive is today. Headless Cross may be derived from Smeethehedley, itself an indication of a role in Feckenham Forest.

Keeping with the Redditch tradition of needle manufacture, Headless Cross once accommodated 3 needle works: the Needle Factory, located where Stonehouse Close is today; Phoenix Works on Birchfield Road and Mount Pleasant Mill on Evesham Road. A large brickworks was situated on Marlpit Lane, as well as a smaller one along Birchfield Road.

There are 2 schools in Headless Cross: The Vaynor First School and Walkwood CE Middle School, both located on Feckenham Road.

Due to its slight altitude advantage, both of Redditch's water towers were built in Headless Cross. The old one still stands having been converted into a private residence. The distinctive shape of the new water tower has become something of a local icon and can be seen dominating the skyline from as far as the Hollybush Inn on Gorcott Hill, approximately 6 km to the east in Warwickshire.

The village also inspired the 1989 Black Sabbath song 'Headless Cross' which features on the album of the same name.

Headless Cross is also the site of an Iron Age hill fort.

Hunt End

Ipsley
Ipsley is home to the corporate headquarters of engineering firm GKN and the former headquarters of Solicitors Regulation Authority, which has since been transformed into apartments. Ipsley is one of the few estates in the town to not have any Council owned housing. In common with Winyates Green, all homes in the Ipsley estate are privately owned.

Lakeside
Lakeside is a largely industrial area of the town. Its location is in close proximity to the Arrow Valley Park. There is also a small housing estate.

Lodge Park
The first houses of the estate built on the Studley Road began construction in the end of the 1950s and finished in the mid-60s to be added to in the 1980s at the top of Barlich Way. There is also a social club with the view of Lodge Park and an outlet of shops one of which Tesco Express which has had its current position since 2003. There are ten different designs of housing in Lodge Park many with their own garages, not including the architects house, which stands on a corner of Barlich Way and Red Hill which features a double garage and a utility room. It is a lovely place to live and features both a middle and a first school.

Matchborough
Matchborough is a large district of Redditch. Its location lies between Winyates, Ipsley and Washford. Matchborough is the location of Arrow Vale High School and Matchborough First School. Matchborough consists of 2 areas, Matchborough East and Matchborough West, it also has a small shopping centre called Matchborough Centre, similar to Church Hill and Winyates Centres. Matchborough contains the area's most iconic feature, Matchborough Pond located near Arrow Vale High School.

Moons Moat
The district of Moon's Moat is an industrial and business estate in the north east of Redditch between Church Hill and Winyates.  Moon's Moat itself is located in Church Hill.

The district takes its name from an ancient moated homestead which was founded by Monks and dates back to the 12th century. It is now a listed heritage site. The medieval homestead was inhabited by the Mohun family which is where the name "Moon's" Moat comes from (Mohun being an early name for Moon). The homestead was last in use in the 18th century, but by the end that century the Mohuns had died out. The homestead fell into disuse and became a ruin. What was left of the homestead was removed so that nothing visible now remains on the site.

The Moon's Moat site is believed by some to be haunted by the ghost of Lady Mohun who is said to appear on or near to the site on the eve of St Agnes (21 January). There is some folklore and history associated with the site concerning a suicide and a murder which may explain the ghost story.

Oakenshaw
Oakenshaw is a largely residential area with a mix of privately owned and social housing. There is a prominent McDonald's in the centre of Oakenshaw on the A441 traffic island and nearby is the largest retail outlet in Redditch, Tesco Extra.

This area gets its name from Oakenshaw Farm, sometimes known as Pheasant Farm. The farm was located, where the underpass from Tesco to Greenlands is today, and a small lane ran from opposite Yvonne Road in Crabbs Cross to Oakenshaw Road in Greenlands, in which modern Oakenshaw lies upon.

Oakenshaw South
Oakenshaw South was built in the 1980s and consists of ten residential closes, all leading off Grangers Lane.

Built on land once belonging to Woodrow Farm, the particularly long pathway dividing Oakenshaw South is in fact the old lane linking the Slough to Woodrow Farm and then onto Studley Road. The Bridleway adjacent to Yarr Mill Close was the first stretch of the lane off the Slough, the pathway opposite carries on until the bend, where the lane was lifted to build Stoneleigh Close. The lane continues south towards Woodrow Drive, then rises to a pathed platform which was once the Redditch to Evesham Railway line. Woodrow Farm was located just before the rise and bend of the path, on the left looking towards the Rough Hill drive Round-a-bout. The old lane continued through what is now Bushley Close, Woodrow North to the Studley Road junction at Woodrow Centre.

Park Farm

Park Farm is an area in south-east Redditch largely comprising industrial and commercial properties

Politically, Park Farm is within the Greenlands ward represented by Councillors Joanna Kane and Juma Begum from the Labour Party, and Councillor Emma Marshall from the Conservative Party.

Riverside
The Redditch area of Riverside runs alongside the River Arrow.  Located between the areas of Enfield and Abbeydale is the location of Forge Mill Needle Museum and the ruins of Bordesley Abbey.  Also located in Riverside is the Abbey Stadium Sports Complex and Redditch Crematorium. The Abbey Stadium has a swimming pool built in 2011. It gained some notoriety at that time as it is partially heated using waste heat from the nearby Crematorium.

Smallwood
Named for the Smallwood Brothers, this area of Redditch contains the Smallwood Alms Houses and the old Victorian factories of Millsborough House.  It is also the location of a B&Q outlet, ASDA Superstore and Matalan. It also is the location of the Redditch Central Mosque.

Southcrest
Southcrest is a residential area of Redditch located on and to the south of Mount Pleasant, between the Town Centre and Headless Cross. It houses the Southcrest Hotel and Plymouth Road Cemetery, and is one of the oldest areas of Redditch. Most of the older buildings date from the late Victorian era and include Southcrest Works, which have now been renovated into privately owned apartments.

St Georges
St Georges is a residential area of Redditch to the south east of the Town Centre. It is home to St George the Martyr Church, Our Lady of Mount Carmel Church, and St Georges Church of England First School. It is largely based around the roads of Beoley Road West and St Georges Road.

Town Centre

The primary commercial core of Redditch is the indoor Kingfisher Shopping Centre. Designed like an out of town mall facility, with fully covered walkways and integrated multi-storey car parks, the Kingfisher Centre was built in place of several established Redditch town centre streets. The walkways are named after these streets.
The centre, along with Church Green and municipal buildings such as the Town Hall, Redditch Central Library and Heart of Worcestershire College are enclosed on three sides by the raised one-way, three-lane Redditch Ringway.  Designed for access to the car parks, it illustrates the early roads for prosperity approach in new town design philosophy applied in the UK in the 1960s and 1980s.

Walkwood
Walkwood is a small suburb of Redditch and is home to the Bramley Cottage Inn and Walkwood Coppice, a nature reserve. Nearby is Morton Stanley Park, a large open area of parkland, which hosts the annual Morton Stanley Festival. On Mason Road there is a small shopping arcade including a post office.

Washford
Washford is primarily a modern industrial estate in south-east Redditch.  It is home to the corporate headquarters of automotive and bicycle accessories retailer Halfords, along with large compressor manufacturer Gardner Denver who have their UK headquarters situated on the old Hydrovane site on Claybrook Drive. The estate also comprises many smaller businesses along the Hemming Road industrial estate. It is named after the Washford Mill, which is now a popular public house and restaurant, though a Mill has stood on this site since 1066 and is mentioned in the Domesday Book.  Many areas of Redditch have similar very early origins: Ipsley, Batchley, Feckenham, Bordesley and Beoley were all Saxon settlements.

Webheath
Webheath is a district of Redditch, in Worcestershire, England. The district neighbours Batchley and the village of Callow Hill. It is also near Feckenham and Astwood Bank. Webheath used to be a village in its own right but is now part of the town of Redditch.

Webheath is home to two first schools, both located on Downsell Road:
 Webheath Academy Primary School
 Mount Carmel Catholic First School

Webheath comes under the West Ward on Redditch Borough Council. It is represented by two councillors, Matthew Dormer (Conservative) and David Thain (Green).

Webheath is the westernmost district of the Redditch constituency.

Winyates

Winyates is a new town estate in eastern Redditch.  It comprises:
 Winyates West
 Winyates East
 Winyates Green, to the east of Winyates East

The West and East areas are separated by Winyates Way, a continuation of Church Hill Way and Matchborough Way, which is largely a bus lane though access is available to Winyates Shopping Centre.  Winyates West adjoins Arrow Valley Park, accessible by a footpath under Battens Drive.

Winyates is home to the Ipsley Alders Marsh Nature Reserve which is an SSSI.

Politically, Winyates elects three councillors to Redditch Borough Council.

Tenacres first school is located in Winyates East. Ipsley Middle School and Roman Way First School are located in Winyates West.

Wirehill
Wire Hill is a small estate which only contains houses. It is located opposite what was once The Jolly Farmer pub in Woodrow, and lies on the same road as the Alexandra Hospital. It is only accessible by Nine Days Lane. The entrance to Wire Hill Woods, which is an area of special scientific interest (SSSI) can also be found here.

Woodrow
This area gets its name from Woodrow Farm which in fact, was located where Oakenshaw South is today. Some roads in Woodrow North's closes, such as Bushley and Cropthorne, are remains of the old Woodrow Farm lane, which started at the Studley Road junction, where Woodrow Centre is today, ending at the Slough in Crabbs Cross. Woodrow North is council housing, whereas Woodrow South is a mix of private and council  dwellings.

The Alexandra Hospital is located in Woodrow.

References

Sources
 

Redditch